The men's 10,000 metres walk at the 2021 World Athletics U20 Championships was held at the Kasarani Stadium on 21 August.

Records

Results
The race was held on 21 August at 09:15.

References

10,000 metres walk
Racewalking at the World Athletics U20 Championships